The Sărișorul Mare is a left tributary of the river Neagra in Romania. It flows into the Neagra in Șaru Dornei.

References

Rivers of Romania
Rivers of Suceava County